This is a list of the Croatia national football team results from the country's independence (in 1991) to 1999.

The first match of the independent Republic of Croatia, against Australia, took place in Melbourne in 1992.

Croatia's first ever competitive matches were in the qualification for UEFA Euro 1996. The team went on to qualify for the final tournament and reached the quarter-finals there.

It then qualified for the 1998 FIFA World Cup finals, where it finished third and won the bronze medals, which was followed by its first ever unsuccessful qualifying campaign, the UEFA Euro 2000 qualifying.

Key 

As per statistical convention in football, matches decided in extra time are counted as wins and losses, while matches decided by penalty shoot-outs are counted as draws.

By year 

In the modern era, the nation played three matches shortly before its independence from Yugoslavia, listed at Croatia national football team results (1940–91).

1992

1993

1994

1995

1996

1997

1998

1999

Record per opponent

External links 

 Croatia  at FIFA.com
 Croatian Football Statistics

1990s in Croatia
1991-99